Microphallus basodactylophallus is a species of digenean parasite in the family Microphallidae. It was first described in 1969, as Carneophallus basodactylophallus, from southern Louisiana, where the raccoon (Procyon lotor) is the definitive host, the first intermediate host is the snail Lyrodes parvula, and the second intermediate host is the crab Callinectes sapidus. It was later moved to the genus Microphallus. In 1988, John Kinsella recorded it from the marsh rice rat (Oryzomys palustris) in a saltmarsh at Cedar Key, Florida. There, it was one of the most prevalent parasites in the marsh rice rat and used C. sapidus as an intermediate host.

References

Literature cited

Kinsella, J.M. 1988. Comparison of helminths of rice rats, Oryzomys palustris, from freshwater and saltwater marshes in Florida. Proceedings of the Helminthological Society of Washington 55(2):275–280.

Plagiorchiida
Invertebrates of North America
Parasites of mammals
Parasites of molluscs
Animals described in 1969